Aleksejs Anufrijevs (Russian: Алексей Никитич Ануфриев; 15 January 1912 –  April 1945) was a Latvian basketball player of Russian origin. Anufrijevs won a gold medal at the 1935 EuroBasket competition, becoming the first European champion. He also participated (as a substitute) at the 1936 Summer Olympics and at the 1937 EuroBasket.

Background
Anufrijevs was born ir Riga and all his playing career played for two Riga basketball clubs. He played for team LVKA (1929–1934) and later for Riga Starts (1935–1939). He became Latvian champion with both teams (1933 and 1938). In 1936 he was awarded as the season's best player for Riga Starts team. During Nazi occupation of Latvia Anufrijevs briefly returned into the rooster of Starts team during season of 1942–43.

Overall Anufrijevs played 15 games for the Latvian national basketball team. When soviets occupied Latvia for the second time in autumn 1944 Anufrijevs was conscripted by Soviet Red Army. He saw action in Courland Pocket and went missing in April 1945.

See also 
 List of people who disappeared

References 

1912 births
1940s missing person cases
1945 deaths
Basketball players from Riga
People from Kreis Riga
Latvian people of Russian descent
Forwards (basketball)
Latvian men's basketball players
Olympic basketball players of Latvia
Soviet military personnel killed in World War II
Missing in action of World War II